Michelle Emma Dickinson , also known as Nanogirl, is a nanotechnologist and science educator based in New Zealand.

Early life and education
Dickinson grew up in Hong Kong, the USA, and the United Kingdom. She had a grandmother from Malta, a grandfather who was English, and a Hong Kong Chinese mother. This may have heightened her awareness of cultural differences. Her father was an English-Maltese soldier.

She displayed skills in computer coding by the time she was eight years old. Dickinson completed a Masters' in Engineering at the University of Manchester and a PhD in Biomedical Materials Engineering at Rutgers University.

Professional life
Dickinson set up and runs New Zealand's sole nanomechanical testing lab, which conducts research into breaking extremely small materials such as cells.

Dickinson is a senior lecturer in Chemical and Material Engineering at Auckland University, and an associate investigator at the MacDiarmid Institute for Advanced Materials and Nanotechnology.

Nanogirl
Dickinson has said that she used to be painfully shy and afraid of public speaking. On the advice of a speaking coach, she invented the alter-ego "Nanogirl" as a way to overcome her nerves. Initially Dickinson used the name "Nanogirl" to write a science blog, then as it became more popular she started a YouTube channel and began to speak at schools and events. She has regular speaking slots on radio and television and is invited to events such as TED conferences. In December 2016, Dickinson delivered a live, theatrical science experiment show titled “Little Bang, Big Bang” in towns, cities and schools around New Zealand during a 3-week tour of the country.

Charity work
Dickinson co-founded the charity OMGTech in 2014 with Vaughan Rowsell and Rab Heath to provide children of all ages and backgrounds access to learning opportunities about technology. Sessions involve hands-on learning of 3D-printing, coding, robotics and science. The charity also supports teachers in low-decile schools to gain confidence in using technology in their teaching. In October 2016, Dickinson resigned from her position at OMG Tech to concentrate on her Nanogirl activities.

Clothes design
In 2015, Dickinson collaborated with the New Zealand clothing company Icebreaker, a technical designer and a printer to produce a line of dresses featuring science and technology-related designs.

Writer 
In 2017, Dickinson wrote No.8 Re-Charged, a book about world-changing innovations from New Zealand. In 2018, she wrote The Kitchen Science Cookbook, a book showcasing science experiments that can be done in the kitchen.

Awards and recognition
Prime Minister's Science Communication Award, 2014
New Zealand Association of Scientists' Science Communicators Award, 2014 
Sir Peter Blake Leadership, 2015
Member of the New Zealand Order of Merit (MNZM) for services to science, 2015 Queen's Birthday Honours
Royal Society of New Zealand's Callaghan Medal, 2015
New Zealand Women of Influence Award for Innovation and Science, 2016
One of the Royal Society Te Apārangi's "150 women in 150 words" in 2017, celebrating the contributions of women to knowledge in New Zealand.

References

External links
 MacDiarmid page

1978 births
Living people
Academic staff of the University of Auckland
New Zealand women academics
New Zealand scientists
Members of the New Zealand Order of Merit
Science communicators
New Zealand Women of Influence Award recipients
New Zealand women engineers
New Zealand women scientists
20th-century New Zealand engineers
21st-century New Zealand engineers
21st-century women engineers
20th-century women engineers